The inscribed wrasse (Notolabrus inscriptus) is a species of marine ray-finned fish from the family Labridae, the wrasses. It is found in the southwestern Pacific Ocean.

Description
The inscribed wrasse is a large species within its genus with the largest males measured at 325mm in standard length, It is said to reach  in standard length. The small juvenile fish are greenish with white markings and an eyespot on the soft part of the dorsal fin and another on the anal fin. The females are brown with white markings on their scales that create thin longitudinal stripes. The males are bluish-grey in colour with the body showing an irregular pattern which resembles scribbles and which give rise to the species common and its specific name. The males also have white dorsal and anal fins.

Distribution
The inscribed wrasse is native to eastern Australia including Lord Howe Island and Norfolk Island, the Kermadec Islands, and the northeast coast of the North Island in New Zealand where its range extends from Cape Reinga to East Cape.  This is an uncommon species off Australian coasts but is abundant off Lord Howe Island, Norfolk Island and the Kermadecs.

Habitat and biology
It is carnivorous, feeding on benthic invertebrates mostly molluscs and crustaceans. Like other species in the genus Notolabrus the males of this species formharems within a territory defended by a male, in this species harems average six females or juveniles.

Taxonomy 
The inscribed wrasse was first formally described as  Labrus inscriptus in 1848 by the Scottish naturalist John Richardson (1787-1865) with the type locality given as Norfolk Island. This species has been recorded as hybridising with Notolabrus fucicola.

References

inscribed wrasse
Marine fish of Eastern Australia
Fauna of New South Wales
Fish of Lord Howe Island
Fauna of Norfolk Island
Fauna of the Kermadec Islands
Fish of the North Island
inscribed wrasse